Bogë is a village in the former Shkrel municipality, northern Albania. At the 2015 local government reform it became part of the municipality Malësi e Madhe. It was a historical bajrak of Kelmendi tribe in the north headwaters of Prroni i thate, bounded to the north by Shala; south by Ducaj. The village was attached to Shkrel despite originally being part of Kelmendi. The village consisted of 75 families in 1908 according to Edith Durham, all of which were Catholics. The village is divided in two sections, consisting of Preçaj and Kolaj neighborhoods.

Etymology 
The etymology of Boga is debated. One theory maintains that it is derived from Albanian bokë, meaning "barren/rocky farmland" or "mountain side". Another view argues that it may be a derivative of Slavic bog ("god").

Culture
The village has a church (Kisha e Bogës), located on 920m above sea level.

Demographic history
In 1908, Edith Durham registered 75 families in Boga, all of which were Catholics.

People
Aleksander Sirdani (1903-1948), pastor of the bajrak of Bogë and historian
Marin Sirdani (1887-1962), pastor of the bajrak of Bogë and historian. The local school is holds his name as he was the first to give lessons in the village.
Dr. Marash Rakaj, a faculty member of the University of Shkodra, "Luigj Gurakuqi" Shkodër.

References

External links

 2015 year

Shkrel
Populated places in Malësi e Madhe
Villages in Shkodër County